Amy McAninch (born ) is a Canadian female curler and curling coach.

Record as a coach of national teams

References

External links

Living people
1975 births
Canadian women curlers
Canadian curling coaches